Drake-Curtis House is a historic home located at Cochecton in Sullivan County, New York.  It is a vernacular frame Federal period dwelling.  It features a -story central block built about 1810, flanked by 1-story wings added about 1840 and 1850.  Also on the property are dry-laid stone retaining walls and a small 19th-century privy.

It was added to the National Register of Historic Places in 1993.

References

Houses on the National Register of Historic Places in New York (state)
Federal architecture in New York (state)
Houses in Sullivan County, New York
National Register of Historic Places in Sullivan County, New York